Kane is an American country rock, southern rock, and Americana band that was formed in 1998 in Los Angeles, California fronted by actor Christian Kane. The band has released two successful independent albums and toured both the U.S. and Europe.

History
Kane was formed in 1998 by Christian Kane, Steve Carlson, and Michael Eaton. Being accomplished songwriters and guitarists whose passion to create and share their special breed of "outlaw country," they soon became a Los Angeles phenomenon.

Kane worked with some of the most talented and creative studio and session musicians in the business. The band gathered a following and was voted the winner of the 2005 Country Thunder Young Guns Contest, was voted one of L.A.'s 100 Hottest Unsigned Bands by industry magazine Music Connection, and Rock City News and E Media Wire Service described them as "Killer."

The band played to good reviews at venues such as the Viper Room, King King, Ivar, Universal Citywalk, the Warner Bros. Sizzlin’ Country fundraiser and around the Southern California area. They performed in such locales as North Carolina, Texas, Oklahoma, Nashville, and Chicago, Tampa, London, and Florence, Arizona on the main stage at Country Thunder USA. Despite somewhat limited touring, Kane’s self-released debut CD sold over 4,500 copies in the US, with almost half those copies selling in countries as far away as Malaysia, Germany, Australia and Brazil.

The band's song "The Chase" appeared on the soundtrack of the 2003 film Just Married.

Trips to Nashville allowed them the opportunity to work with Billy Barnett, Kent Blazy, Blair Daly, Brett James and Troy Verges, Jeremy Stover, Tommy Lee James, Clay Mills and Keith Follese.

In 2004, Christian signed as a songwriter with EMI Nashville. The band name Kane was abandoned, instead backing Christian Kane as a solo artist.

Band members
 Christian Kane - lead vocals
 Steve Carlson - rhythm guitar, backing vocals
 Craig Eastman - fiddle, lap steel, mandolin
 Jason Southard - lead guitar
 Michael Eaton - lead guitar, composer
 Will Amend - bass guitar
 Ted Russell Kamp - bass guitar
 Ryan Baker - drums
 Timothy Jimenez - drums
 Melissa Reiner - violin

Discography

Self Released

Filmography

References

External links
 Kane's official site (version saved by the Internet Archive at end of 2007)
 Christian Kane's official site
 Steve Carlson's official site

Country music groups from California